An L-drive is a type of azimuth thruster where the electric motor is mounted vertically, removing the second bevel gear from the drivetrain.  Azimuth thruster pods can be rotated through a full 360 degrees, allowing for rapid changes in thrust direction and eliminating the need for a conventional rudder.  This form of power transmission is called a L-drive because the rotary motion has to make one right angle turn, thus looking a bit like the letter "L". This name is used to make clear the arrangement of drive is different from Z-drive.

See also

Notes

Marine propulsion